Agonum sordidum is a species of ground beetle in the Platyninae subfamily. It is found in European countries like the former Yugoslavian states of Croatia and Slovenia, and the former Soviet Union state of Ukraine. It can be found in countries like Albania, and on islands such as Crete and Dodecanese. Belgium, Greece, and Italy, are also common distribution places for the species. Also it is widely distributed in Asia, in countries like Lebanon, Syria, and Turkey.

References

Beetles described in 1828
sordidum
Beetles of Asia
Beetles of Europe